The Maizière family is a German noble family of Huguenot ancestry that migrated from the Duchy of Lorraine to what is now Germany in the late 17th century. Several family members have had and still have important roles in German politics and business. 

The name derives from Maizières-lès-Metz, a village in the Moselle department, now in France, with which ancestors were connected.

Important family members 

Gustav Maizier, doctor
  (1841–1898), Landgerichtspräsident of Neuruppin and one of the authors of the civil code of Germany.
 Walter de Maizière (1876–1915), lawyer
 Clemens de Maizière (1906–1980), GDR lawyer, Member of the Ost-CDU and a Stasi spy
 Lothar de Maizière (born 1940), GDR lawyer, Member of the Ost-CDU, later the only democratically elected Prime Minister of East Germany
 Ulrich de Maizière (1912–2006), Chief of staff of the Bundeswehr 1966–1972
  (born 1950), former member of Commerzbank's board of directors
 Thomas de Maizière (born 1954), Chief of the Chancellor's Office and later Minister in the cabinet of Angela Merkel

References